Shaun Simpson may refer to:
 Shaun Simpson (motorcyclist)
 Shaun Simpson (wrestler)

See also
 Shawn Simpson, Canadian ice hockey player